Charles Cawetzka (March 1, 1877 Detroit, Michigan – October 23, 1951) was a United States Army soldier who received the Medal of Honor for actions on August 23, 1900, during the Philippine–American War. Private Cawetzka protected a wounded comrade from a "numerically superior enemy". Private Cawetzka is buried in Romulus Memorial Cemetery in Romulus, Michigan.

Medal of Honor citation
Rank and Organization: Private, Company F, 30th Infantry, U.S. Volunteers. Place and Date: Near Sariaya, Luzon, Philippine Islands, August 23, 1900. Entered Service At: Wayne, Mich. Birth: Detroit, Mich. Date of Issue: March 14, 1902.

Citation:

Single-handed, he defended a disabled comrade against a greatly superior force of the enemy.

See also

 List of Medal of Honor recipients
 List of Philippine–American War Medal of Honor recipients

Notes

References

External links
 

United States Army soldiers
United States Army Medal of Honor recipients
1877 births
1951 deaths
Military personnel from Detroit
American military personnel of the Philippine–American War
Philippine–American War recipients of the Medal of Honor